In linear algebra, a Hessenberg matrix is a special kind of square matrix, one that is "almost" triangular. To be exact, an upper Hessenberg matrix has zero entries below the first subdiagonal, and a lower Hessenberg matrix has zero entries above the first superdiagonal. They are named after Karl Hessenberg.

Definitions

Upper Hessenberg matrix

An upper Hessenberg matrix is called unreduced if all subdiagonal entries are nonzero, i.e. if  for all .

Lower Hessenberg matrix

A lower Hessenberg matrix is called unreduced if all superdiagonal entries are nonzero, i.e. if  for all .

Examples
Consider the following matrices.

Computer programming
Many linear algebra algorithms require significantly less computational effort when applied to triangular matrices, and this improvement often carries over to Hessenberg matrices as well. If the constraints of a linear algebra problem do not allow a general matrix to be conveniently reduced to a triangular one, reduction to Hessenberg form is often the next best thing. In fact, reduction of any matrix to a Hessenberg form can be achieved in a finite number of steps (for example, through Householder's transformation of unitary similarity transforms). Subsequent reduction of Hessenberg matrix to a triangular matrix can be achieved through iterative procedures, such as shifted QR-factorization. In eigenvalue algorithms, the Hessenberg matrix can be further reduced to a triangular matrix through Shifted QR-factorization combined with deflation steps. Reducing a general matrix to a Hessenberg matrix and then reducing further to a triangular matrix, instead of directly reducing a general matrix to a triangular matrix, often economizes the arithmetic involved in the QR algorithm for eigenvalue problems.

Reduction to Hessenberg matrix
Any  matrix can be transformed into a Hessenberg matrix by a similarity transformation using Householder transformations. The following procedure for such a transformation is adapted from A Second Course In Linear Algebra by Garcia & Roger.

Construct the  householder matrix  where

Continue like this for a total of  steps.

Hence, any matrix can be transformed to an upper Hessenberg matrix by a similarity transformation of the form .

Properties
For , it is vacuously true that every  matrix is both upper Hessenberg, and lower Hessenberg.

The product of a Hessenberg matrix with a triangular matrix is again Hessenberg.

A matrix that is both upper Hessenberg and lower Hessenberg is a tridiagonal matrix, of which symmetric or Hermitian Hessenberg matrices are important examples. A Hermitian matrix can be reduced to tri-diagonal real symmetric matrices.

Hessenberg operator
The Hessenberg operator is an infinite dimensional Hessenberg matrix. It commonly occurs as the generalization of the Jacobi operator to a system of orthogonal polynomials for the space of square-integrable holomorphic functions over some domain—that is, a Bergman space. In this case, the Hessenberg operator is  the right-shift operator , given by 
.

The eigenvalues of each principal submatrix of the Hessenberg operator are given by the characteristic polynomial for that submatrix. These polynomials are called the Bergman polynomials, and provide an orthogonal polynomial basis for Bergman space.

See also
Hessenberg variety

Notes

References 
 .
 .

External links 
 Hessenberg matrix at MathWorld.
 
 High performance algorithms for reduction to condensed (Hessenberg, tridiagonal, bidiagonal) form

Matrices